Ludwig Leupold (18 July 1907 – September 1993) was a German sports shooter. He competed in the 25 m pistol event at the 1952 Summer Olympics.

References

1907 births
1993 deaths
German male sport shooters
Olympic shooters of Germany
Shooters at the 1952 Summer Olympics
Place of birth missing